UNFC may refer to:
United Nationalities Federal Council
United Nations Framework Classification for Resources